Julia Kerr (28 August 1898 – 3 October 1965) was a German composer and pianist. As a composer she used the name Julia Kerwey. She also worked as a translator during the Nuremberg trials.

Biography
Kerr was born in Wiesbaden on 28 August 1898 as Julia Anna Franziska Weismann to the Prussian prosecutor Robert Weismann and his wife Gertrud, née Reichenheim. Her brother was the violinist Dietrich "Diez" Weismann (1900–1982). She studied music with Wilhelm Klatte in Berlin. Kerr married theater critic Alfred Kerr in April 1920. They had Michael and Judith Kerr. The family were Jewish and it became necessary to flee Germany in 1933. Initially they fled to Switzerland and then France before settling in England in 1935. In London Kerr worked in secretarial jobs until the end of the war. Once the war was over she took roles as an interpreter and secretary in the Nuremberg war crimes trial. Kerr had returned to live in Germany after the war and was living in Berlin when she suffered a heart attack and died.

Kerr's first opera's was Die schoene Lau after a fairy tale by Eduard Mörike, first performed in 1928 In 1929 Alfred started to write the libretto for her second opera Der Chronoplan  which was delayed due to her emigration. Kerr also composed songs, often after poems by her husband

References

1898 births
1965 deaths
People from Wiesbaden
20th-century German composers
Jewish emigrants from Nazi Germany to the United Kingdom